Hush sound may refer to:
 Shh, a sound requesting silence
 The Hush Sound, an American indie pop band